Stranski Vrh is a settlement in the Municipality of Litija in central Slovenia. The area is part of the traditional region of Lower Carniola and is now included with the rest of the municipality in the Central Sava Statistical Region.

The local church is dedicated to Saint Lawrence and belongs to the Parish of Šentjurij–Podkum. It was built in the 18th century.

References

External links
Stranski Vrh on Geopedia

Populated places in the Municipality of Litija